A by-election was held for the Australian House of Representatives seat of Wentworth on 8 December 1956. This was triggered by the resignation of Liberal Party MP Eric Harrison.

The by-election was narrowly won by Liberal Party candidate Les Bury. His final opponent on the two-party-preferred vote, after overtaking the Labor candidate on preferences, was Reg Robson, brother of recently deposed state Liberal leader Murray Robson. Murray Robson supported his brother during the campaign, and it was reported that there was "some talk of expelling" Robson from the party for his role.

Results

See also
 List of Australian federal by-elections

References

1956 elections in Australia
New South Wales federal by-elections